Collinsville is an unincorporated community and former village in southeastern Milford Township, Butler County, Ohio, United States.  It has a post office with the ZIP code 45004.  It lies at the intersection of U.S. Route 127 and State Route 73.

Collinsville was laid out in 1802.  The community was named for Charles Collins, a first settler.

Collinsville receives public services from the Milford Twp. Department of Public Works. Station 161 of the Milford Twp. Fire Department is located in and services the community while the Seven Mile Fire Department and Life Squad Station 171 provide EMS service.

References

Unincorporated communities in Butler County, Ohio
1802 establishments in the Northwest Territory
Populated places established in 1802
Former municipalities in Ohio
Unincorporated communities in Ohio